The Fogo Champion's Cup or the Fogo Champion's Trophy (Portuguese: Taça da Campeões do Fogo, Capeverdean Creole: ALUPEK: Tasa da Kampionis du Fugu) is a single knockout football (soccer) competition that is played each season in the island of Fogo, Cape Verde. The competition features the champion from the Premier Division and the champion of the Second Division.  The trophy competition is organized by the Fogo Regional Football Association (Associação Regional do Fogo, ARFF). Its current winner is Onze Unidos who won their only title.

The Champion's Cup (or Trophy) was introduced in 2016.  The first edition took place in November, 2016 and featured Vulcânicos (Premier Division) and Real Marítimo (Second Division) which were the first club to participate. The 2017 edition which featured the Premier Division champ Vulcânicos and the Second Division champ Nova Era was not played as the Second Division club did not shown up.

Winners

See also
Fogo Premier Division
Fogo Second Division
Fogo Island Cup
Fogo Super Cup
Fogo Opening Tournament

References

External links
Fogo Regional Football Association which includes the Champion's Cup (or Trophy) 

Sport in Fogo, Cape Verde
Football cup competitions in Cape Verde
2016 establishments in Cape Verde
Recurring sporting events established in 2016